Ajay Choudhari  is a Shiv Sena Legislative Party leader and politician from Mumbai, Maharashtra. He is current Member of the Legislative Assembly from Shivadi Vidhan Sabha constituency of Mumbai, Maharashtra, India as a member of Shiv Sena.

Positions held
 2014: Elected to Maharashtra Legislative Assembly
 2015: Shiv Sena Sampark Pramukh Nashik
 2019: Re-Elected to Maharashtra Legislative Assembly
 2022: Elected as Shiv Sena Legislative Party Leader

See also
 Mumbai South Lok Sabha constituency

References

External links
  Shivsena Home Page 

Living people
Maharashtra MLAs 2014–2019
Shiv Sena politicians
Marathi politicians
Year of birth missing (living people)